The New Jersey Election Law Enforcement Commission (ELEC) is an independent governmental agency that is responsible for monitoring the integrity of campaign finances in elections in New Jersey. The Commission was established in 1973.

Candidates for all public elections in New Jersey are required to file contribution and expenditure reports. ELEC also administers public financing for those running in primary or general elections for Governor of New Jersey.  The Commission administers aspects of New Jersey "pay-to-play" laws, registration of governmental affairs agents (lobbyists) and quarterly disclosure of lobbying activity, and requires personal financial disclosure statements for certain candidates.

Normally composed of four members, two Democrats and two Republicans, selected by the Governor of New Jersey, the commission has had a vacant seat since November 2011, the second year of the governorship of Chris Christie. They were Ronald DeFilippis‚ Chairman;	Jeffrey M. Brindle‚ Executive Director; and Walter F. Timpone‚ Vice Chairman.

In March 2017 the commission, which had been unable to act for a year because of a lack of a quorum, was restored to four members. Currently, there are three Commissioners: Eric H. Jaso, Chairman; Stephen M. Holden, Commissioner; and Marguerite T. Simon, Commissioner.

References

State agencies of New Jersey
Election commissions in the United States
New Jersey elections